Events from the year 1858 in the United States.

Incumbents

Federal Government 
 President: James Buchanan (D-Pennsylvania)
 Vice President: John C. Breckinridge (D-Kentucky)
 Chief Justice: Roger B. Taney (Maryland)
 Speaker of the House of Representatives: James Lawrence Orr (D-South Carolina)
 Congress: 35th

Events
 March 4 – A speech by James Henry Hammond in the United States Senate promotes the idea of "King Cotton" and the "mudsill theory" in support of slave labor. 
 April 19 – The United States and the Yankton Sioux Tribe sign a treaty.
 May 11 – Minnesota is admitted as the 32nd U.S. state (see History of Minnesota).
 May 19 – The Marais des Cygnes massacre is perpetrated by pro-slavery forces in Bleeding Kansas.
 June 16 – Abraham Lincoln makes his "House Divided" Speech at the State Capitol in Springfield, Illinois, on accepting the Republican Party nomination for a seat in the U.S. Senate.
 July – Forty-Niners stream into the Rocky Mountains of the western United States during the Pike's Peak Gold Rush.
 July 8 – The Paulist Fathers, a Roman Catholic society of apostolic life for men, is founded in New York City by Isaac Hecker.
 August 16 – U.S. President James Buchanan inaugurates the new trans-Atlantic telegraph cable by exchanging greetings with Queen Victoria. However, a weak signal forces a shutdown of the service in a few weeks.
 August 21 – The first of the seven Lincoln–Douglas debates is held.
 September 1–2 – 'Staten Island Quarantine War'.
 September 14 – Fordyce Beals patents his six shooter revolver which will be produced by E. Remington & Sons of Ilion, New York as the Remington Model 1858.
 November 17 – Denver is founded.
 December 8 – Rensselaer, Indiana is incorporated.

Ongoing
 Bleeding Kansas (1854–1860)
 Third Seminole War (1855–1858)
 Utah War (1857–1858)

Births
 January 6 – Albert Henry Munsell, painter, teacher of art and inventor of the Munsell color system (died 1918)
 January 9 – Elizabeth Gertrude Britton, botanist (died 1934)
 January 11 – Harry Gordon Selfridge, department store magnate (died 1947)
 February 6 – Jonathan P. Dolliver, U.S. Senator from Iowa from 1900 to 1910 (died 1910)
 February 15 – John Joseph Montgomery, glider pioneer (died 1911)
 February 19 – Charles Alexander Eastman, Native American author, physician, reformer and co-founder of Boy Scouts of America (died 1939)
 February 28 – Richard P. Ernst, U.S. Senator from Kentucky from 1921 to 1927 (died 1934)
 March 9 – Gustav Stickley, furniture designer and architect (died 1942)
 March 12 – Adolph Ochs, newspaper publisher (died 1935)
 March 24 – Elia Goode Byington, newspaper proprietor, editor, and manager (died 1936)
 March 30 – DeWolf Hopper, musical theater performer (died 1935)
 April 23 – Leonor F. Loree, railroad executive (died 1940)
 April 29 – Georgia Hopley, journalist, political figure and temperance advocate (died 1944)
 June 17 – Mary F. Hoyt, first woman appointed to the U.S. federal civil service, in 1883 (died 1958)
 June 20 – Charles Waddell Chesnutt, African American author, essayist and political activist (died 1932)
 June 28 – Otis Skinner, actor (died 1943)
 July 1 – Velma Caldwell Melville, editor and writer (died 1924)
 August 18 – Thomas S. Rodgers, admiral (died 1931)
 September 1 – Andrew Jackson Zilker, philanthropist (died 1934)
 September 12 – J. H. Smith, politician and pioneer (died 1956)
 September 30 – Estelle M. H. Merrill, journalist (died 1908)
 October 2 – Emma Amelia Cranmer, prohibition reformer and suffragist (died 1937)
 October 7 – Joseph E. Ransdell, U.S. Senator from Louisiana from 1913 to 1931 (died 1954)
 October 12 – John L. Sullivan, heavyweight boxer (died 1918)
 October 15 – William Sims, admiral (died 1936)
 October 27 – Theodore Roosevelt, 26th President of the United States from 1901 to 1909, 25th Vice President of the United States from March to September 1901 (died 1919)
 October 30 – Wilson Eyre, architect (died 1944)
 November 8 – Lawrence Yates Sherman, U.S. Senator from Illinois from 1913 to 1921 (died 1939)
 November 21 – Charles A. Towne, U.S. Senator from Minnesota from 1900 to 1901 (died 1928)
 November 26 – Katharine Drexel, Roman Catholic foundress, first American canonized as a saint, in 2000 (died 1955)
 December 15 – Elizabeth Eggleston Seelye, biographer (died 1923)
 December 24 – Harriet Pritchard Arnold, author (died 1901)
 December 25 – Herman P. Faris, temperance movement leader (died 1936)
 December 31 – Harry Stewart New, U.S. Senator from Indiana from 1917 to 1923 (died 1937)
 Unknown – Sarah Jim Mayo, Washoe basket weaver (died 1918)

Deaths
 January 10 – Hezekiah Augur, sculptor and inventor (born 1791)
 March 4 – Commodore Matthew Calbraith Perry, naval officer (born 1794)
 April 10 – Thomas Hart Benton, U.S. Senator from Missouri from 1821 to 1851 (born 1782)
 August 23 – Calvin Willey, U.S. Senator from Connecticut from 1825 to 1831 (born 1776)
 September 17 – Dred Scott, slave (born c. 1795)
 September 21 – Arthur P. Bagby, U.S. Senator from Alabama from 1837 to 1841 (born 1794)
 November 16 – Robert Hanna, U.S. Senator from Indiana from 1831 to 1832 (born 1786)
 December 14 – Michael Woolston Ash, U.S. Representative from Pennsylvania from 1835 to 1837 (born 1789)
 December 18 – Thomas Holley Chivers, poet and physician (born 1809)

See also
Timeline of United States history (1820–1859)

References

External links
 

 
1850s in the United States
United States
United States
Years of the 19th century in the United States